Orok Orok Essien  (born 25 January 1992) is a Nigerian professional footballer who plays as a forward.

Career

Early career
As a youth, Orok played for Audu Babes and Mozico. He then went on to play for amateur clubs Calabar Rover, Anantigha Warriors, and Anambra United. He then went on a short loan to Kenkre F.C. in the I-League 2nd Division in India before playing for George Telegraph S.C. in West Bengal.

Mumbai
On 20 September 2013 it was announced that Essien had signed for Mumbai F.C. of the Indian I-League for the 2013–14 season. He then made his professional debut for the side the next day on 21 September against Sporting Goa in which he started and played the whole match as Mumbai drew 1–1.

Career statistics

References

1992 births
Living people
Nigerian footballers
Mumbai FC players
Association football forwards
I-League players
Expatriate footballers in India
Aryan FC players